Dysoxylum arborescens, commonly known in Australia as Mossman mahogany, is a small tree in the mahogany family Meliaceae. It is native to rainforests of Malesia, Papuasia, Queensland and nearby islands.

Description
It has bark that is grey-brown, smooth or with mild cracking, and which bears large conspicuous lenticels. The leafy twigs are also grey-brown and lenticellate. 

The compound leaves are arranged in whorls or spirals and are pinnate with 5 to 9 leaflets, usually with a terminal leaflet. The proximal leaflets (i.e. the ones closest to the twig) are the smallest, with successive leaflets getting larger, and the terminal leaflet is the largest.

They are glabrous, bright pink-red in colour and usually contains 5 seeds.

Taxonomy
This species was originally described as Goniocheton arborescens in 1825 by the German-Dutch botanist Carl Ludwig Blume, but was given its current combination in 1868 by the Dutch botanist Friedrich Anton Wilhelm Miquel in his paper Monographia Meliacearum Archipelagi Indici, published in Annales Musei Botanici Lugduno-Batavi Vol 4 p.24

Etymology
The genus name Dysoxylum is a construction from the Ancient Greek words dys "bad", osmḗ "smell", and xylon "wood", and refers to the unsavoury odour of the timber of some species.

The species epithet is from the Latin word , meaning "tree-like", which may be a reference to its relatively small stature.

Ecology
This tree is the host for larvae of the orange emperor butterfly.

Cultivation and uses
The Australian botanist David L. Jones wrote in his 1986 book Rainforest Plants of Australia that this species "has good potential as a garden plant and is of manageable dimensions".

Distribution and habitat
Dysoxylum arborescens is native to the Andaman and Nicobar Islands, Taiwan, Malaysia, Borneo, Indonesia, New Guinea the Bismark Archipelago, Queensland, the Solomon Islands and Vanuatu. It is a common species, growing in a variety of rainforest habitats from sea-level to  altitude.

Conservation
This species is listed by the Queensland Department of Environment and Science as least concern. , it has not been assessed by the IUCN.

Gallery

References

External links
 
 
 View a map of historical sightings of this species at the Australasian Virtual Herbarium
 View observations of this species on iNaturalist
 View images of this species on Flickriver

arborescens
Flora of the Andaman Islands
Flora of the Nicobar Islands
Trees of Taiwan
Trees of Malesia
Trees of Papua New Guinea
Trees of the Solomon Islands
Trees of Australia
Flora of Queensland
Trees of Vanuatu
Plants described in 1825
Taxa named by Friedrich Anton Wilhelm Miquel